is a Japanese ski jumper. Team bronze medalist at the 2016 Nordic Junior World Ski Championships.

His younger sister, Anju Nakamura, competes in the Nordic Combined. His best individual result so far is 3rd place in the competition in Ruka in the season 2022–23.

References

1996 births
Living people
Japanese male ski jumpers
Olympic ski jumpers of Japan
Ski jumpers at the 2022 Winter Olympics
Ski jumpers at the 2017 Asian Winter Games
Asian Games medalists in ski jumping
Medalists at the 2017 Asian Winter Games
Asian Games gold medalists for Japan